James Skoufis (born October 18, 1987) is an American politician of the Democratic Party currently representing the 42nd District of the New York State Senate since 2023. Skoufis previously represented the 39th District prior to redistricting from 2019 to 2022.

Skoufis began his political career on the Woodbury town board in Orange County. In 2012 he was elected to the New York State Assembly, becoming its youngest member at 25. He was re-elected in 2014 and 2016.

Background
Skoufis was born in Flushing, Queens in 1987, the son of a Greek immigrant. His family moved north to the town of Woodbury in the Hudson Valley in 1995. He graduated from Monroe-Woodbury High School in 2005. He went on to earn a bachelor's degree summa cum laude from The George Washington University and a masters from Columbia University.

Before his time in the state legislature, Skoufis was a project manager at an electronic security firm and a member of the Woodbury Town Board.  On the Town Board, Skoufis distinguished himself in the wake of Hurricane Irene by leading the local relief effort and helping affected families with food, shelter, and financial assistance.

Skoufis married his wife Hillary at Manhattan's The Pierre in May 2017. They welcomed their first child in 2021. He has one sibling, a sister.

New York State Assembly

After redistricting in 2012 following the decennial census, long-time Republican Assemblywoman Nancy Calhoun  decided to retire, leaving the seat vacant. Skoufis received the Democratic nomination for the seat, defeating Larry Delarose at the party's county convention. In the November general election, he defeated Republican Goshen Mayor Kyle Roddey   with 56% of the vote. At age 24, he became the youngest member of the Assembly.

Skoufis introduced his first two bills within a week of being sworn in; both were inspired by the aftermath of Hurricane Irene in 2011. Both bills passed the Assembly a few months later.

Also in his first session, Assemblyman Skoufis was an outspoken supporter of increasing the minimum wage, as well as tax incentives to attract new businesses to the Hudson Valley. Skoufis also voted to repeal the payroll tax that funds the Metropolitan Transportation Authority in outlying counties it serves, co-sponsored legislation to prohibit tax breaks for businesses that outsource jobs, and supports an elimination of the property tax system in favor of a fairer, broader-based system.

Early in 2014, Skoufis introduced Tuition-Free NY, a proposal to make SUNY and CUNY in New York State tuition-free as long as students fulfill community service and residency requirements. The proposal garnered bipartisan support in the Assembly and won praise from some editorial boards.

New York State Senate 
In 2018, longtime Senator William J. Larkin Jr. decided to retire at the age of 88. He had served in the seat since 1991. While Skoufis had been rumored as an opponent to Larkin for sometime, he never opted to run. However, with Larkin no longer running, Skoufis entered the race. In a good year for Democrats, Skoufis defeated Republican Stony Point Councilman Tom Basile, 54 percent to 46 percent. Democrats also took the majority in the Senate in the same election.

In the Senate, Skoufis serves as the Chair of the Committee on Investigations and Government Operations.

Skoufis contracted COVID-19 during the pandemic. On May 5, 2020, he announced he had been symptom-free for two weeks and was able to end his self-isolation. "The past two weeks [we]re the sickest I have ever felt", he said.

Electoral history

New York State Assembly

New York State Senate

See also

List of Columbia University alumni
List of George Washington University alumni
List of Greek Americans

References

External links
 Assembly Website

|-

|-

Living people
1987 births
Democratic Party New York (state) state senators
Democratic Party members of the New York State Assembly
American people of Greek descent
21st-century American politicians
George Washington University alumni
Columbia University alumni
People from Flushing, Queens
People from Woodbury, Orange County, New York